Target drone is intended as a system with ground to air defense role and as well as training role. The drone has a modern Ground Control Station which enables mission planning and re-tasking, mission rehearsal and playback and training of operators for system usage. A wide and flexible selection of mission payloads installed inside the fuselage, effectively complies with the requirements of most complex missile systems engagement scenarios for training and weapon systems test and evaluation purposes. WF-B1A high speed target drone is used for air defense/air force operation trainning and missile system development and evaluation. It features high maneuver, low RCS, low IR emission and super low altitude capabilities,

Performance 
Altitude range 	from 200 [m] up to 5,000 [m]
Speed range 	from  554 km/h up 1054 km/h
Maximum normal overload 	5[g]
Maximum speed 1067 km/h at 5 000 m
Controllable range 	300 km (150 km radius)
Altitude 	200 m to 5000 m

Partner 2015 
First time show by EdePro.

See also
Pegaz 011
Rapier Unmanned Helicopter
IAI Scout
AAI RQ-7 Shadow

References

Unmanned military aircraft of Serbia
Military Technical Institute Belgrade
Target drones